Yttrium lithium fluoride (LiYF4, sometimes abbreviated YLF) is a birefringent crystal, typically doped with neodymium or praseodymium and used as a 
gain medium in solid-state lasers. Yttrium is the substitutional element in LiYF4. The hardness of YLF is significantly lower than other commons crystalline laser media, i.e. yttrium aluminium garnet.

References

See also
Neodymium-doped yttrium lithium fluoride

Optical materials
Crystals
Yttrium compounds
Lithium compounds
Fluorides
Metal halides